Chloride is a compound of chlorine as a salt or an ester of hydrogen chloride.

Chloride may also refer to:
 Chloride, Arizona, United States
 Chloride, Missouri, an unincorporated community
 Chloride, New Mexico, an unincorporated community
 Chloride Group, a UK supplier of secure power systems
 Chloride Electrical Storage Company, a UK manufacturer of storage batteries